25th BSFC Awards
December 13, 2004

Best Film: 
 Sideways 
The 25th Boston Society of Film Critics Awards, honoring the best in filmmaking in 2004, were given on 13 December 2004.

Winners

Best Film:
Sideways
Runner-up: Before Sunset
Best Actor:
Jamie Foxx – Ray
Runner-up: Paul Giamatti – Sideways
Best Actress:
Hilary Swank – Million Dollar Baby
Runner-up (TIE): Annette Bening – Being Julia and Kim Basinger – The Door in the Floor
Best Supporting Actor:
Thomas Haden Church – Sideways
Runner-up: Clive Owen – Closer
Best Supporting Actress (TIE):
Laura Dern – We Don't Live Here Anymore
Sharon Warren – Ray
Runner-up: Cate Blanchett – The Aviator
Best Director:
Zhang Yimou – House of Flying Daggers (Shi mian mai fu)
Runner-up: Alexander Payne – Sideways
Best Screenplay:
Alexander Payne and Jim Taylor – Sideways
Runner-up: Charlie Kaufman – Eternal Sunshine of the Spotless Mind
Best Cinematography:
Zhao Xiaoding – House of Flying Daggers (Shi mian mai fu)
Runner-up: Bruno Delbonnel – A Very Long Engagement (Un long dimanche de fiançailles)
Best Documentary:
Control Room
Runner-up: Touching the Void
Best Foreign-Language Film:
House of Flying Daggers (Shi mian mai fu) • China/Hong Kong
Runner-up: A Very Long Engagement (Un long dimanche de fiançailles) • France/United States
Best New Filmmaker:
Jonathan Caouette – Tarnation
Runner-up (TIE): Nicole Kassell – The Woodsman and Joshua Marston – Maria Full of Grace
Best Ensemble Cast:
Sideways
Runner-up: The Life Aquatic with Steve Zissou

External links
 Past Winners

References
 Boston film critics flip for ‘Sideways’ Variety
 BOSTON CRITICS NAME `SIDEWAYS' BEST FILM Boston Globe
 Boston Film Critics moviecitynews

2004
2004 film awards
2004 awards in the United States
2004 in Boston
December 2004 events in the United States